Erik Valter Lindström (2 January 1918 – 2 September 1955) was a Swedish ski jumper. He competed in the normal hill event at the 1948 Winter Olympics and served as the Swedish flag bearer at those games.

References

1918 births
1955 deaths
Ski jumpers at the 1948 Winter Olympics
Olympic ski jumpers of Sweden
Swedish male ski jumpers
People from Örnsköldsvik Municipality
Sportspeople from Västernorrland County